The resilience of coral reefs is the biological ability of coral reefs to recover from natural and anthropogenic disturbances such as storms and bleaching episodes. Resilience refers to the ability of biological or social systems to overcome pressures and stresses by maintaining key functions through resisting or adapting to change. Reef resistance measures how well coral reefs tolerate changes in ocean chemistry, sea level, and sea surface temperature. Reef resistance and resilience are important factors in coral reef recovery from the effects of ocean acidification. Natural reef resilience can be used as a recovery model for coral reefs and an opportunity for management in marine protected areas (MPAs).


Thermal tolerance 
Many corals rely on a symbiotic algae called zooxanthellae for nutrient uptake through photosynthesis. Corals obtain about 60-85% of their total nutrition from symbiotic zooxanthellae. Slight increases in sea surface temperature can cause zooxanthellae to die. Coral hosts become bleached when they lose their zooxanthellae. Difference in symbionts, determined by genetic groupings (clades A-H), may explain thermal tolerance in corals. Research has shown that some corals contain thermally-resistant clades of zooxanthellae. Corals housing primarily clade D symbionts, and certain types of thermally-resistant clade C symbionts, allow corals to avoid bleaching as severely as others experiencing the same stressor. Scientists remain in debate if thermal resistance in corals is due to a mixing or shifting of symbionts, or thermally resistant vs. thermally-sensitive types of zooxanthellae. Species of coral housing multiple types of zooxanthellae can withstand a 1-1.5 °C change in temperature. However, few species of coral are known to house multiple types of zooxanthellae. Corals are more likely to contain clade D symbionts after multiple coral bleaching events.

Reef recovery

Research studies of the Mediterranean species of coral Oculina patagonica reveal that the presence of endolithic algae in coral skeletons may provide additional energy which can result in post-bleaching recovery. During bleaching, the loss of zooxanthellae decreases the amount of light absorbed by coral tissue, which allows increased amounts of photosynthetically active radiation to penetrate the coral skeleton. Greater amounts of photosynthetically active radiation in coral skeletons causes an increase in endolithic algae biomass and production of photoassimilates. During bleaching, the energy input to the coral tissue of phototrophic endoliths expands as the energy input of the zooxanthellae dwindles. This additional energy could explain the survival and rapid recovery of O. patagonica after bleaching events. A study by the Australian Research Council proposed that the loss of fast-growing coral could lead to less resilience of the remaining coral. The study was undertaken in both the Caribbean and the Indo-Pacific and reached the conclusion that the latter may be more resilient than the former based on several factors; the process of herbivory and the rates of algal blooms forming.

Coral Bleaching effects on Biodiversity 

Coral bleaching is a major consequence of stress on coral reefs. Bleaching events due to distinct temperature changes, pollution, and other shifts of environmental conditions are detrimental to coral health, but corals can restore from bleaching events if the stress is not chronic. When corals are exposed to a long period of severe stress, death may occur due to the loss of zooxanthellae, who are vital to the coral's survival because of the nutrients they supply. Coral bleaching, degradation, and death have a great effect on the surrounding ecosystem and biodiversity. Coral reefs are important, diverse ecosystems that host a plethora of organisms who contribute different services to maintain reef health. For example, herbivorous reef fish, like the parrotfish, maintain levels of macro algae. The upkeep of sea weed contributes to decreasing space competition for substrate seeking organisms, like corals, to establish and propagate, creating a stronger, more resilient reef. However, when corals become bleached, organisms often leave the coral reef habitat which in turn takes away the services that they were previously supplying. Reefs also administer many ecosystem services such as food provision for many people around the world who are dependent on fishing reefs to sustain themselves. There is evidence that some species of coral are resilient to elevated sea surface temperatures for a short period of time.

Anthropogenic Disturbances 
Anthropogenic forces contribute to coral reef degradation, reducing their resiliency. Some anthropogenic forces that degrade corals include pollution, sedimentation from coastal development, and ocean acidification due to increased fossil fuel emissions. The combustion of fossil fuels results in the emission of green house gases, such as carbon dioxide into the atmosphere. The ocean uptakes some of the emitted carbon dioxide, injurious to the natural processes that occur in the ocean. Ocean acidification results in a lower ocean water pH, negatively affecting the formation of calcium carbonate structures which are imperative to coral development. Developing coastal areas has the potential for chemical and nutrient pollution to run off into surrounding waters. Nutrient pollution causes the overgrowth of water plants which have the ability to out compete corals for space, nutrients, and other resources. Another anthropogenic force that degrades coral reefs is bottom trawling; a fishing practice that scrapes coral reef habitats and other bottom substrate dwelling organisms off the ocean floor. Bottom trawling results in physical wreckage and stress that leads to corals being broken and zooxanthellae expelled.

Managing coral reefs
In an attempt to prevent coral bleaching, scientists are experimenting by "seeding" corals that can host multiple types of zooxanthellae with thermally-resistant zooxanthellae. MPAs have begun to apply reef resilience management techniques in order to improve the 'immune system' of coral reefs and promote reef recovery after bleaching.

The Nature Conservancy has developed, and is continually refining, a model to help manage and promote reef resilience. Although this model does not guarantee reef resilience, it is a comprehensible management model to follow. The principles outlined in their model are:

 Representation and replication: Coral survivorship is ensured by representing and replicating resilient species and habitats in an MPA network. The presence of resilient species in management in MPAs will help protect corals from bleaching events and other natural disturbances.
 Critical areas: Conservation priority areas provide protection to critical marine areas, such as sources of larvae for coral reef regeneration or nursery habitats for fish spawning.
 Connectivity: Preserving the connectivity between coral reefs and surrounding habitats provides healthy coral communities and fish habitat.
 Effective management: Resilience based strategies are based on reducing threats to maintain healthy reefs. Measurements of effective management of MPAs allows for adaptive management.

References

Further references 
 Oliver, Thomas Andrew (2009) The role of coral's algal symbionts in coral reef adaptation to climate change ProQuest. .

External links 
 Reef resilience – coral reef conservation site of The Nature Conservancy